Sanity may refer to:
 Sanity, the state of being of sound mind and therefore legally responsible for one's actions
 Sanity (song), a song by Killing Joke
 "Sanity", a song by Matt Brouwer from Imagerical
 Sanity (music store), an Australian music store chain
 SAnitY, a professional wrestling faction in WWE
 Sanity: Aiken's Artifact, a 2000 video game developed by Monolith Productions
 Sanity check